This is a list of National Indoor Football League seasons since the league started in 2001.

2001 | 2002 | 2003 | 2004 | 2005 | 2006 | 2007

See also